Marga Legal (18 February 1908 – 30 October 2001) was a German actress. She is the daughter of actor Ernst Legal and appeared in more than one hundred films from 1952 to 2001.

Selected filmography

References

External links 

1908 births
2001 deaths
Actresses from Berlin
Socialist Unity Party of Germany politicians
Members of the 5th Volkskammer
Democratic Women's League of Germany members
Cultural Association of the GDR members
German film actresses
Recipients of the National Prize of East Germany
Recipients of the Patriotic Order of Merit in gold
20th-century German women